Culture for Pigeon is the third official release from Tracy + the Plastics and the band's second full-length album.  It was released in 2004 on Troubleman Unlimited.  Culture for Pigeon includes a DVD with two of Wynne Greenwood's video pieces which bridges the gap between listening to a CD of Tracy + the Plastics and attending one of their richer multimedia concerts. The album was engineered by Joel Hamilton

Track listing

Disc One (Audio CD)
 "Big Stereo" – 2:47
 "Knit a Claw" – 2:59
 "Henrietta" – 2:33
 "Happens" – 3:32
 "Save Me Claude" – 2:04
 "Quaasars" – 3:06
 "Cut Glass See Thru" – 1:07
 "Oh Birds" – 2:03
 "This is Dog-City" – 2:27
 "What You Still Want" – 2:13
 "+ Mountain" – 0:55

Disc Two (DVD Video)
 "We Hear Swooping Guitars (Tracy + the Practice)"
 "Just the Beginning of Something (Maybe this Will Explain Some Relations)"

References 

2004 albums
Tracy + the Plastics albums